The Alfa Romeo Eagle is a concept car built by Pininfarina. The car debuted at the Turin Auto Show in 1975.

Background
Three years after unveiling their Alfetta Spider prototype built using the chassis and drive-train of the Alfetta berlina, Pininfarina presented a new Alfa-based styling exercise. Like the Alfetta Spider, the Eagle had a targa top, but was built using the Alfetta GT as a base. The goal was to show that it was possible to design an open car with good passive safety.

The car
The Eagle's wedge-shaped body was designed by Aldo Brovarone, who drew inspiration from the sports prototype cars of the time and the Alfa Romeo 33/TT/12 in particular. The body was characterized by a prominent rearward-inclined or swept-back roll-over bar. The interior diverged strongly from the contemporary Alfa style, with soft matte plastic dashboard finishes, a mono-spoke steering wheel and fully digital instrumentation.

With a  4-cylinder Twin Cam engine in standard GT tune, good aerodynamics and weighing just , the Eagle was rated at a maximum speed of  while returning significantly better consumption than the model from which it was derived.

As with Pininfarina's earlier Spider proposal, the Eagle did not go into production. Alfa Romeo's management instead opted to refresh the style of the Duetto.

References

Eagle
Pininfarina vehicles
Cars introduced in 1975